Boatswain's Mate James Byrnes (born James Fisher, 1838 – February 9, 1882) was an Irish sailor who fought in the American Civil War. Byrnes received the United States' highest award for bravery during combat, the Medal of Honor, for his action aboard the  during the Battle of Fort Hindman. He was honored with the award on 3 April 1863.

Biography
Byrnes was born in Ireland in 1838. He enlisted in the Navy from New York, and was assigned to the USS Louisville.

Medal of Honor citation

See also

List of American Civil War Medal of Honor recipients: A–F

References

1838 births
1882 deaths
People of New York (state) in the American Civil War
Irish-born Medal of Honor recipients
Union Navy officers
United States Navy Medal of Honor recipients
American Civil War recipients of the Medal of Honor